The Book of Shemaiah the Prophet is one of the non-canonical books referenced in the Bible. It was probably written by the biblical prophet Shemaiah, who lived at the time of Rehoboam. This text is sometimes called Shemaiah the Prophet or The Acts of Shemaiah the Prophet.

The book is described at :

See also 
 Biblical canon
 Lost work

References 

Lost Jewish texts